Mark van Eldik (born 1967) is a Dutch rally driver, who scored World Rally Championship points on the 2010 Rallye Deutschland with a ninth-place finish.

Career
Van Eldik began rallying in 2002, competing in Dutch national events. In 2005 he made his World Rally Championship debut on Rally Catalunya, finishing 29th overall in his Group N Mitsubishi Lancer Evolution VIII. In 2006 he purchased a Subaru Impreza S8 WRC, which he then replaced with a newer S10 version later in the year. He competed in that car on the 2006 Rallye Deutschland, where he finished 24th overall. At the end of the year he competed in Wales Rally GB in a Group N Mitsubishi, finishing 41st. For 2007, van Eldik purchased an Impreza S12 from Prodrive, which he used to take the Dutch championship title. He also finished 26th on the 2007 Rally Deutschland, retired with mechanical failure on the 2007 Rally Catalunya and finished 34th on the 2007 Wales Rally GB. In 2008, van Eldik competed on just the one WRC event, 2008 Rallye Deutschland, where he finished 23rd. In 2009, he competed in both an Impreza S14 WRC and a Mitsubishi Lancer WRC 05. In 2010 he has also used a Škoda Fabia S2000, in which he retired from the 2010 Ypres Rally. At the 2010 Rallye Deutschland, van Eldik scored his best WRC result to date with a ninth-place finish, also picking up two world championship points.

Career results

WRC results

References

External links

 van Eldik's team website

1967 births
Living people
Dutch rally drivers
World Rally Championship drivers
Intercontinental Rally Challenge drivers
People from Montfoort
Sportspeople from Utrecht (province)